Pachi (also Romanized as Pāchī; also known as Pājī) is a village in Banaft Rural District, Dodangeh District, Sari County, Mazandaran Province, Iran. At the 2006 census, its population was 432, in 117 families.

References 

Populated places in Sari County